The Leader of the Opposition in Malaysian Federal Politics is a Member of Parliament in the Dewan Rakyat (House of Representatives). The Leader of the Opposition is, by convention, the leader of the largest political party in the Dewan Rakyat that is not in government.

When in the Dewan Rakyat, the Leader of the Opposition sits on the left-hand side of the centre table, in front of the Opposition and opposite the Prime Minister. The Opposition Leader is elected by the minority party of the House according to its rules. A new Opposition Leader may be elected when the incumbent dies, resigns, or is challenged for the leadership.

Malaysia is a constitutional monarchy with a parliamentary system and is based on the Westminster model. The Opposition is an important component of the Westminster system, with the Opposition directing criticism at the Government's policies and programs, give close attention to all proposed legislation and attempts to defeat and replace the Government. The Opposition is therefore known as the 'government in waiting' and it is a formal part of the parliamentary system.

Since November 2022, PN has been the largest Malaysian Opposition. Previously, the longest-serving Opposition Leader had been Lim Kit Siang, who served for a total of 28 years (from 1975-1999 and then from 2004-2008).

List of leaders of the opposition of Malaysia
Colour key' (for political parties and coalitions):

Notes

References

 
Malaysia
Parliament of Malaysia